The Switch is a 2010 American romantic comedy film directed by Will Speck and Josh Gordon. Based on a screenplay written by Allan Loeb, the film, formerly titled The Baster, was inspired by the short story "Baster" by Jeffrey Eugenides. This was originally published in The New Yorker in 1996. The film stars Jennifer Aniston, Jason Bateman, and child actor Thomas Robinson. Patrick Wilson, Juliette Lewis, and Jeff Goldblum appear in key supporting roles.

Filming began and took place in 2009. Upon its release, The Switch received mixed reviews from critics, who praised its premise and the performances of its cast, but felt that the plot was formulaic.

This was the final Miramax Films movie to be distributed by Walt Disney Studios Motion Pictures during the Disney ownership before Disney sold Miramax to Filmyard Holdings on December 3, 2010.

Plot
30-something Kassie Larson is single, hasn't found love yet, and decides she wants to have a baby. Despite the objections of her long-time best friend Wally Mars, she chooses to do so alone because she can't wait any longer. She also wants a face-to-face sperm donor, disdaining using a sperm bank.

Wally suggests he be the donor, but Kassie believes he is too neurotic, pessimistic, and self-absorbed. Since they are best friends, she thinks "that would be weird." He has always had feelings for Kassie, and they dated six years ago. His friend Leonard points out he missed his chance when she relegated him to the "friend zone."

Kassie selects Roland Nilson as her sperm donor; he is a handsome, charming, and married assistant professor at Columbia University. She organizes an "insemination party", where Wally meets Roland and takes an instant dislike to him. Roland produces his sperm in the bathroom, leaving it in a sample cup. Wally uses the bathroom and sees the sample. Drunk, he plays with the cup and accidentally spills it into the sink. Panicking, he replaces the sperm with his own.

The next day at work, still hungover, he remembers nothing. The insemination is successful and Kassie becomes pregnant. Wally is upset when she says that she is returning to her childhood home town in Minnesota, as she thinks it would be a better place to raise a child than New York City. She leaves, and Wally sinks into a dreary period.

Seven years later, Kassie returns to New York with Sebastian, her precocious and neurotic six-year-old. She wants to reconnect with Wally, and eagerly introduces her boy to him and Wally eventually bonds with Sebastian. Roland is in the picture, as he got divorced and Kassie has started dating him. She believes he is Sebastian's biological father and the relationship might work.

Wally notices the strong similarities between him and Sebastian and realizes the result of the switch seven years earlier. Just before Roland proposes to Kassie, Wally reveals to her that Sebastian is his biological son, and he loves her. Shocked and angry about the switch, she rejects him.

After some time passes, Wally finds Kassie waiting for him one day after he leaves work. She says that Sebastian really misses and needs him. Wally admits he misses and needs Sebastian, too. Kassie says that she is no longer with Roland and has realized she loves Wally, so he proposes. The final scene shows a happily married Wally and Kassie giving Sebastian an eighth birthday party.

Cast
 Jennifer Aniston as Kassie Larson
 Jason Bateman as Wally Mars
 Thomas Robinson as Sebastian Larson
 Bryce Robinson as older Sebastian 
 Patrick Wilson as Roland Nilson
 Juliette Lewis as Debbie Epstein
 Jeff Goldblum as Leonard
 Caroline Dhavernas as Pauline
 Scott Elrod as Teddy Declan
 Diane Sawyer as herself (cameo)

Production
Aniston revealed in the DVD "extras" that she had known Bateman since she was 25, and the producers and directors noted their good chemistry in working together.

Release
The film was released on August 20, 2010 in the United States by Walt Disney Studios Motion Pictures.

Critical reception
The review aggregator website Rotten Tomatoes reported that 52% of critics gave the film a positive rating, based on 155 reviews, with an average score of 5.50/10. Its consensus states "The Switch has an interesting premise and a charming cast; unfortunately, it also has a trite script that hews too close to tired rom-com formulas." On Metacritic, which uses a normalized rating system, the film holds a 52/100 rating, based on 30 reviews, indicating "mixed or average reviews". Aniston was nominated for a Razzie Award for Worst Actress for her performance in the film.

Ann Hornaday, writing for The Washington Post gave The Switch three out of four stars. She wrote that "this disarmingly winning comedy turns into a warm, quirkily observant film, strengthened by some appealing performances and a low-key, easygoing vibe. Less reminiscent of the dreadful comedy The Back-up Plan than 2002's lovely About a Boy, this adaptation of a Jeffrey Eugenides story takes viewers down a path that, while by no means of least resistance, possesses a gratifying share of surprises." Los Angeles Times author Betsy Sharkey noted that the film "is what you might call a Bate-and-switch affair. More his journey than hers, more satire than slapstick, the film is that rare example of rom-com about men, which turns out to be a nice switch indeed." She also compared it to About a Boy and Lisa Cholodenko's 2010 film The Kids Are All Right, adding: "Though the film never quite rises to the level of either, the filmmakers show enough restraint to keep things interesting, Aniston and Bateman keep things both light and dark when they should, and Robinson's Sebastian steals everyone's heart."

Michael Phillips of the Chicago Tribune remarked that while "Jennifer Aniston gets top billing, the character played by Jason Bateman sets the tone." He found that "around the halfway point it starts getting interesting and the people who put it together are at least working in a realm of reasonable intelligence and wit and respect for the audience. I wish it were great, but 'pretty good' puts it ahead of plenty of recent romantic comedies." Similarly, Andrew O'Hehir from Salon.com wrote, "here comes the surprise: It's peculiar, and pretty good! Taken on its own terms, it's a light, sweet, curiously enjoyable misfit romance, whose real star is not Aniston but her magnificently awkward Lothario, Jason Bateman." Owen Gleiberman from Entertainment Weekly gave the film a B rating and called it "a pleasant surprise. It's a by-the-numbers movie, but the dots that get connected feel new."

Less enthusiastic with the film, Detroit Newss Tom Long wrote that "it's not a bad film, really, just sort of average. But Bateman is so good in it – natural, funny, yet full of real emotion – that you immediately want to see him again in a better film." Barely impressed, Joe Neumaier of New York Daily News called the film a "Judd Apatow lite, Farrelly brothers special blend. Just call it When Harry Met Sally... and Her Ovum. Andrew Barker from Variety felt that The Switch was "an unfunny, manipulative romance about two unlikable people and their prop of a son [...] The pic mangles the premise of its source material."

Commercial success
Even though it gained mixed reviews from critics, The Switch proved to be a moderate financial success. Budgeted at $19 million, it grossed $49.8 million worldwide, 55.7% of which came from its domestic run. 91 days in US theatres, it opened in 2,012 theaters and was ranked seventh after its opening weekend, averaging $4,193 per venue. On January 18, 2011, Maple Pictures released the film on DVD and Blu-ray in Canada, while Lionsgate released it in the United States on March 15, 2011. It grossed $7.7 million in US DVD sales.

Accolades

Soundtrack

References

External links
 
 
 
 
 
 

2010 romantic comedy-drama films
2010 films
American romantic comedy-drama films
Films set in New York (state)
Echo Films films
Films directed by Will Speck and Josh Gordon
Films scored by Alex Wurman
Films about sperm donation
Films based on short fiction
Films with screenplays by Allan Loeb
Miramax films
Mandate Pictures films
2010s English-language films
2010s American films